Tomislav Dujmović (born 26 February 1981) is a Croatian retired footballer who played as a defensive midfielder.

Club career

Croatia
Dujmović stated playing football in lower league club NK Sava Zagreb where he was noticed by Croatian giants Dinamo Zagreb. But he never managed to get senior cap for Dinamo so he was forced to leave club in 2000. Next six years he played for Croatian yo-yo clubs Hrvatski Dragovoljac, Inter Zaprešić and Međimurje before leaving for Russia in 2006.

Russia
Dujmović joined Amkar Perm of Russian Premier League where he soon proved himself as one of the best defensive midfielders in league. After his contract with Amkar expired, Dujmović joined Lokomotiv Moscow where he stayed only for season and half before transferring to Lokomotiv's city rivals Dynamo Moscow for 3 million Euro. Dujmović was a regular first team member in Dynamo, but subsequently lost his place after arrival of new manager Sergei Silkin.

Real Zaragoza
Struggling Spanish La Liga team Real Zaragoza acquired Dujmović on loan from Dinamo Moscow on 17 January 2012. Dujmović had his debut for Zaragoza on 22 January in a game against UD Levante.

International career 
Dujmović was called up by Croatian national team manager Slaven Bilić for a friendly game against Liechtenstein in Vinkovci on 14 November 2009. He made his national team debut in the same match, playing 20 minutes as a second-half substitute. He has earned a total of 19 caps, scoring no goals. His final international was a June 2012 UEFA Euro 2012 match against Ireland.

References

External links
 

1981 births
Living people
Footballers from Zagreb
Association football midfielders
Croatian footballers
Croatia international footballers
UEFA Euro 2012 players
NK Hrvatski Dragovoljac players
NK Inter Zaprešić players
NK Međimurje players
FC Amkar Perm players
FC Lokomotiv Moscow players
FC Dynamo Moscow players
Real Zaragoza players
FC Mordovia Saransk players
RNK Split players
Croatian Football League players
First Football League (Croatia) players
Russian Premier League players
La Liga players
Croatian expatriate footballers
Expatriate footballers in Russia
Croatian expatriate sportspeople in Russia
Expatriate footballers in Spain
Croatian expatriate sportspeople in Spain